Lisa Bernstein is a lawyer and law professor. She currently serves as the Wilson-Dickinson Professor of Law at the University of Chicago Law School. Her work is in the field of law and economics and she is the co-editor of the textbook Customary Law and Economics.

Education 
In 1986, Bernstein earned a BA in economics from the University of Chicago, where she was Phi Beta Kappa, then a JD from Harvard Law School in 1990. At Harvard she was a John M. Olin Fellow in Law and Economic, receiving a stipend and faculty mentorship to write a research paper in the field. She credits this opportunity with launching her academic career, as the resulting paper distinguished her in the pool of applicants for her first academic post.

Career 
Bernstein was on faculty at Boston University (beginning in 1991) and Georgetown University (beginning in 1995) before joining the University of Chicago faculty in 1998. She is Wilson-Dickinson Professor of Law at the University of Chicago Law School. 

With Francesco Parisi, Bernstein edited Customary Law and Economics (Edward Elgar, 2014).

Publications

References

External links 

 Lectures on the "Myth of the Law Merchant”

Living people
University of Chicago alumni
Harvard Law School alumni
University of Chicago Law School faculty
Year of birth missing (living people)